The 2022 Southern Conference women's basketball tournament was the postseason women's basketball tournament for the Southern Conference (SoCon) for the 2021–22 season. All tournaments games were played at the Harrah's Cherokee Center in Asheville, North Carolina, from March 3 to 6, 2022. The winner of the tournament received the conference's automatic bid to the 2022 NCAA Division I women's basketball tournament.

Seeds
Teams are seeded by record within the conference, with a tiebreaker system to seed teams with identical conference records.

Schedule
All tournament games are streamed on  ESPN+. The championship is televised across the region on select Nexstar stations and simulcast on ESPN+.

Bracket
 All times are Eastern.

See also
2022 Southern Conference men's basketball tournament

References

2021–22 Southern Conference women's basketball season
SoCon women's
College basketball tournaments in North Carolina
SoCon women's
Southern Conference women's basketball tournament
Southern Conference women's basketball tournament